Team6 Game Studios B.V. is a privately owned, Dutch video game developer based in Assen, Netherlands. 

Founded in 2001 with a different name, the creative team developed several games. Then, in 2003, the founders decided to change the name to Team6 Game Studios B.V. The company currently employs approximately 40 workers and is headed by Director Ronnie Nelis.

As of 2019, Team6 has developed more than 80 games for gaming consoles such as Xbox, PlayStation, Oculus, HTC Vive, and Nintendo, as well as for iOS and Windows based operating systems. While the majority of Team6’s releases are racing games, Team6 includes other genres such as action-shooters. The Studio is best known for FlatOut 3: Chaos & Destruction. Other notable titles are Road Rage, which Metacritic lists as the second-worst game of 2017, and Taxi Chaos which Metacritic lists as the fourth-worst game of 2021. Since 2016, the studio decided to fully focus on mobile and console games. It is currently also working on health & exercise games and VR titles.

History
Team6 Game Studios was founded by Ronnie Nelis in 2001. Ronnie Nelis's first project was a fighting game called Death Compatible, developed for a contest of the game magazine PC Zone. Nelis won the first prize in the contest and as a prize; the game would be released, however, the publisher who would also close its doors shortly after. Despite this setback, Nells founded Team6 Game Studios V.O.F., and found a new partner to release their first official title: Taxi Challenge Berlin. In the years after, they specialized in racing games and created many titles over the years. For several of their titles they worked together with car brands like Mercedes, Volkswagen, BMW, and Opel.

Most of their games were developed for PC, but starting in 2009 they also developed several titles for Nintendo Wii and Nintendo DS. The studios' own Engine Six was one of the first engines that supported Nintendo Wii and Nintendo 3DS. 

Since 2012, the studio has been the official developer for the Monster Jam games for publisher Game Mill and IP holder Feld Motorsports, who wanted to take the franchise more kids-friendly instead of hardcore simulation.

In 2012, the studio developed the world's first official squash video game simulation in collaboration with the World Squash Federation. The studio also developed a second squash game in 2015 which was officially licensed by the Professional Squash Association. 

In 2013, Team6 created FlatOut Stuntman in collaboration with Nvidia. The Android game was used as a showcase for Nvidia as it supported specific features of the Tegra mobile processor. FlatOut Stuntman received an average score of 4.1 out 5, based on over 25,000 votes on Google Play.

Up till 2014 Team6 created most of their titles in their own Engine Six. 

In 2014, they started using Unity for their mobile games, and in 2015 they switched to the Unreal Engine for their console titles. 

Along the way, the studio also started developing mobile games for Android and iOS. Originally their first mobile title was New Kids Nitro Racer, however this was ultimately only released on PC.

In 2014 Team6 partnered up with the health and wellness startup Blue Goji. Together they create interactive fitness games made to play while working out on cardio equipment. Their first title was the iOS game Super Sonic Racers. 

In 2016 they together released their first VR title: DinoFense.

Games
2002
Taxi Challenge Berlin
2003
Taxi Racer Hong Kong 2
Taxi Racer New York 2
2004
Shanghai Street Racer
Taxi Racer London 2
2005
Taxi 3: eXtreme Rush
Downtown Challenge
Manhattan Chase
Scooter War3z
Pizza Dude
2006
Glacier
Tesco Ice Racing
Super Taxi Driver 2006
Paris Chase
2007
ESR: European Street Racing
GSR: German Street Racing
Fiat 500
Ultimate Motorcross
X1 Super Boost / F1 Chequered Flag
2008
Ultimate Monster Trucks
Mercedes CLC Dream Test Drive
Alpha Zylon
2009
Street Racer Europe
Amsterdam Taxi Madness
Glacier 2
Monster Trucks Mayhem
2010
Battle Metal: Street Riot Control / Highspeed Control: Carbon-Edition
Calvin Tucker's Redneck: Farm Animals Racing Tournament
FlatOut (Wii)
Glacier 3: The Meltdown
Speed
Big City Racer
Heavy, The (cancelled)
2011
Street Racer Europe 2
FlatOut 3: Chaos & Destruction
Supersonic Racer
Hyper Fighters
2012
WSF Squash
Speed 2
2013
New Kids Nitro Racer
FlatOut Stuntman
2014
Super Sonic Racers
Engines of War
PSA World Tour Squash
2015
Monster Jam: As Big As It Gets
Monster Jam: Battlegrounds
Battle Waves
Goji Farm
2016
Monster Jam: Crush It!
DinoFense
2017
Road Rage
Uphill Rush
2018
Super Street: The Game
2019
Street Outlaws: The List
Super Street Racer
2021
Taxi Chaos
Street Outlaws 2: Winner Takes All
2022
NHRA Championship Drag Racing: Speed For All

References

External links
 

Video game companies of the Netherlands
Companies based in Assens Municipality
Dutch companies established in 2001
Video game companies established in 2001
Video game development companies